Rocky is a 2013 Indian Bengali-language action thriller film directed by Sujit Mondal, starring Mimoh and Pooja. Earlier  Sayantika was signed to play the female lead role as Nandini, But after a few days of shooting she refused to play the character as she did not like the change made in the story. The film also has Mithun Chakraborty in guest appearance. The film is the remake of the 2011 Telugu-language film Oosaravelli.

Plot
Rocky is a goon from Mumbai and does anything for money. He is on a mission and constantly runs away from the police. Everyone relates to him as a 'chameleon' who constantly changes colors. Rocky finally reaches Kashmir and meets Nandini, and he instantly falls in love with her. Rocky rescues Nandini while being kidnapped by terrorists. Later Rocky finds that Nandini is already engaged to Avik. Avik is a goon (and the minister's son), but Nandini doesn't know that. When Nandini finds out that Avik is a goon, she dumps him. And she also discovers that she is in love with Rocky. Later on, Rocky kills Avik and the minister. One day when Rocky, Nandini, and Diya (Nandini's friend) go to the temple, Diya sees Rocky killing someone. And then there is a flashback about how he and Nandini met before, but she lost her memory. That happened because Nandini's brother was an undercover cop, and when goons found out, they killed the whole family. The only one who survived was Nandini, but she had a bullet in her head. The doctors said that she would lose her memory soon. So, she tells Rocky to kill the people who killed her family because she had seen Rocky beating up a bunch of people. In the end, Rocky kills all the goons who killed Nandini's family.

Cast
 Mimoh as Rocky, a local gangster of Mumbai.
 Pooja as Nandini/Anindita
 Mithun Chakraborty as Fatakeshto Rocky's father (cameo) / special appearance in an item song named "Rocky Bhai"
 Somnath Panja
 Bharat Kaul as Mafia Ravi Verma, the most wanted person in Interpol
 Surajit Sen as Raj Verma, Ravi Verma's younger brother
 Abir Goswami as an undercover police officer and Nandini's elder brother
 Rajat Ganguly as a corrupt Housing Minister Vinayak Sen
 Sujoy as minister's son, Avik Sen

Soundtrack

Reception
The music of Rocky, and the film as well, received bad reviews and was declared a flop at box office.This movie questioned the existence of Mimoh.

References

External links 
 

Bengali-language Indian films
2010s Bengali-language films
2013 action thriller films
2013 films
Bengali remakes of Telugu films
Films about contract killing in India
Indian action thriller films
Films scored by Jeet Ganguly